The Daytime Emmy Award for Outstanding Game Show Host was an award presented annually by the National Academy of Television Arts and Sciences (NATAS) and Academy of Television Arts & Sciences (ATAS). It was given to honor the outstanding work of a game show host who has appeared in at least 19% of total episodes for the calendar year.

The 1st Daytime Emmy Awards  ceremony was held in 1974  with Peter Marshall receiving the award for his hosting duty on the panel game show Hollywood Squares. The award category was originally called Outstanding Host or Hostess in a Game or Audience Participation Show before changing to its current title in 1985. The awards ceremony was not aired on television in 1983 and 1984, having been criticized for voting integrity. The Emmy was named after an "Immy", an affectionate term used to refer to the image orthicon camera tube. The statuette was designed by Louis McManus, who modeled the award after his wife, Dorothy. The Emmy statuette is fifteen inches tall from base to tip, weighing five pounds and is composed of iron, pewter, zinc and gold.

Since its inception, the award has been given to 18 hosts. In 1983, Betty White became the first woman to win the award and eventually was joined by Meredith Vieira 22 years later as the only two females to have garnered the award.  Steve Harvey and Wayne Brady are the only African American game show hosts to have won the Emmy.  In 1990, Bob Barker and Alex Trebek tied for the award, which was the first tie in this category. Also in 1990,  Barker became the host with the most wins in the category when he won a fifth time, surpassing Marshall's previous record of four; Barker went on to win in nine additional years, ultimately receiving fourteen wins. Trebek has since received five additional wins. Trebek last won the award at the 2021 ceremony, which was accepted posthumously due to his death in November 2020. Trebek also has been nominated on 32 occasions, more than any other host. 

At the 2022 ceremony, Harvey became the last awarded host in this category for his hosting duties on Family Feud. In 2023, this category will be moved to the Primetime Emmy Awards as part of a re-alignment of categories between NATAS and ATAS and will be renamed Outstanding Host for a Game Show.

Winners and nominees
Listed below are the winners of the award for each year, as well as the other nominees.

1970s

1980s

1990s

2000s

2010s

2020s

Multiple wins and nominations

The following individuals received two or more Game Show Host awards:

The following individuals received two or more Game Show Host nominations:

See also
 Daytime Emmy Award
 Outstanding Game Show
 Primetime Emmy Award for Outstanding Host for a Game Show

References

External links
 

Retired Daytime Emmy Awards
Daytime Emmy Awards
Awards established in 1974
1974 establishments in the United States